This list of reptiles of the Netherlands is extracted from the Reptile Database. It applies to the Kingdom of the Netherlands. Species not endemic to constituent country in western Europe are indicated by inclusion of their distribution within the kingdom.

Turtles and terrapins
Loggerhead sea turtle, Caretta caretta (Linnaeus, 1758)
Green sea turtle, Chelonia mydas (Linnaeus, 1758)
Leatherback sea turtle, Dermochelys coriacea (Vandelli, 1761)
Hawksbill sea turtle, Eretmochelys imbricata (Linnaeus, 1766)
European pond turtle, Emys orbicularis (Linnaeus, 1758)
Pond slider, Trachemys scripta (Thunberg in Schoepff, 1792)

Lizards
Slow worm, Anguis fragilis Linnaeus, 1758
Sand lizard, Lacerta agilis Linnaeus, 1758
Common wall lizard, Podarcis muralis (Laurenti, 1768)
Viviparous lizard, Zootoca vivipara (Lichtenstein, 1823)

Snakes
Red-bellied racer, Alsophis rufiventris (Duméril, Bibron & Duméril, 1854) — Saba and Sint Eustatius
Smooth snake, Coronella austriaca Laurenti, 1768
Barred grass snake, Natrix helvetica (Linnaeus, 1758)
Common European adder, Vipera berus (Linnaeus, 1758)

References

 
Netherlands